is a district located in Nagano Prefecture, Japan.

As of 2003, the district has an estimated population of 46,162 and a density of 181.18 persons per km2. The total area is 254.79 km2.

Towns and villages
Hara
Fujimi
Shimosuwa

Districts in Nagano Prefecture